Histamine N-methyltransferase (HNMT, HMT) is an enzyme involved in the metabolism of histamine. It is one of two enzymes involved in the metabolism of histamine in mammals, the other being diamine oxidase (DAO). HNMT catalyzes the methylation of histamine in the presence of S-adenosylmethionine (SAM-e) forming N-methylhistamine. The HNMT enzyme is present in most body tissues but is not present in serum. Histamine N-methyltransferase is encoded by a single gene, HNMT, which in humans has been mapped to chromosome 2.

Function 
The function of the HNMT enzyme is histamine metabolism by ways of Nτ-methylation using SAM-e as the methyl donor, producing N-methylhistamine, which, unless excreted, can be further processed by monoamine oxidase B (MAOB) or by DAO. Methylated histamine metabolites are excreted with urine.

In mammals, histamine is metabolized by two major pathways: oxidative deamination via DAO, encoded by the AOC1 gene, and Nτ-methylation via HNMT, encoded by the HNMT gene. In brain of mammals histamine neurotransmitter activity is controlled by Nτ-methylation since DAO is not present in the central nervous system.

As about the biologic species, the HNMT enzyme is found in vertebrates, including birds, reptiles and amphibian, but not in invertebrates and plants.

The HNMT enzyme resides in the cytosol intracellular fluid. Whereas DAO metabolizes extracellular free histamine, be it either exogenous came with food or mostly endogenous released from granules of mast cells and basophils as a result of allergic reactions, in view of the fact that DAO is mainly expressed in the cells of intestinal epithelium, HNMT is involved in metabolism of the persistently present intracellular primarily endogenous histamine, mainly in kidneys and liver, but also in bronchi, large intestine, ovary, prostate, spinal cord, spleen, trachea and peripheral tissues. In the case of flawed HNMT activity, the organs which are most affected are brain, liver and mucous membrane of bronchus. Consequently, flawed HNMT activity leads to chronic forms of histamine intolerance. For instance, the main symptoms of histamine intolerance within the nervous system are anxiety, dizziness, fatigue, insomnia, myoclonic twitching and unrest. Overall, the symptoms of flawed HNMT activity are typical of symptoms of histamine intolerance, including allergic rhinitis, urticaria (hives), and peptic ulcer disease.

Measurements 
Whereas DAO comes to the blood stream from the organs where it is expressed (small bowel and large intestine ascendens, kidney, etc.) in a continuous manner and stored in plasma membrane-associated vesicular structures in epithelial cells, and therefore serum DAO activity can be reliably measured while diagnosing histamine intolerance, measurement of intracellular HNMT which presents primarily in the cells of the internal organs, like the liver, is troublesome, so diagnosis is done, as a rule, indirectly, through testing for genetic variants. Although the consequences of flawed DAO activity are often periodic, the consequences of flawed HNMT activity occur immediately, and the symptoms also immediately appear, for example, after meals.

Genetic variants 
The most studied genetic variant is T allele at rs11558538 (c.314C>T, p.Thr105Ile), a loss-of-function allele reducing HNMT activity and associated with diseases, typical for histamine intolerance, such as asthma, allergic rhinitis and atopic eczema (atopic dermatitis). Therefore the owners of this variant should avoid intake of HNMT inhibitors which hamper enzyme activity, and also should avoid intake of histamine liberators which release histamine from granules of mast cells and basophils. In a study of 48 adults, median enzyme activity was significantly lower in subjects with the CT or TT genotype than in those with the wild-type CC genotype (485 versus 631 U/mL of red blood cells). In another study of 195 subjects, the C314T variant also showed an association with serum Interleukin-8 (IL-8) levels — individuals with the CT or TT genotype had lower levels of IL-8 ( versus 2.1) and higher levels of histamine ( versus ) in comparison with individuals with the CC genotype. The carriers of CT and TT genotypes were merged in one group in this study because there were too few participants with TT to form a group large enough to make statistical relevance, therefore CT and TT might have different enzyme activity which is not yet studied . This effect may indicate that there may be a link between this genetic variant and inflammation. Although the relationship between histamine and IL-8 has not been fully studied , it is known that histamine can increase the expression of IL-8 through H1 receptors in vitro and enhance the release of IL-8 in different cell types.

Other genetic variants have been also identified to affect enzyme function. The rs1050891 (939A>G, 3′-UTR) variant leads to increased enzymatic activity (messenger RNA stability), while rs758252808 (c.179G>A, p.Gly60Asp) and rs745756308 (c.623T>C, p. Leu208Pro) lead to decreased enzymatic activity.

Inhibitors 
The following substances are known to be HNMT inhibitors: amodiaquine, chloroquine, dimaprit, etoprine, metoprine, quinacrine, SKF-91488, tacrine and diphenhydramine. HNMT inhibitors may increase histamine levels in peripheral tissues and exacerbate histamine-related diseases, such as allergic rhinitis, urticaria, and peptic ulcer disease. However, the effect of HNMT inhibitors on brain function is not yet fully understood. Some studies suggest that an increase in brain histamine levels by novel HNMT inhibitors could contribute to the improvement of brain disorders.

See also 
Diamine oxidase (DAO)
Histamine
Histamine intolerance

References

External links 
 
 PDBe-KB provides an overview of all the structure information available in the PDB for human histamine N-methyltransferase

EC 2.1.1
Histamine